Lauan may refer to:

 Lauan (tree), several varieties of tree known as Philippine mahogany
 Lauan ground skink, a species of lizard found on the Lau Islands of Fiji
 Lauan language, a language spoken in East Fiji
 Lauan plywood, decorative plywood made with Philippine mahogany

See also 
 Luan (disambiguation)